Amy Groening is a Canadian actress from Winnipeg, Manitoba. She is most noted for her performance as Chicky in the film Bone Cage, for which she received a Canadian Screen Award nomination for Best Supporting Actress at the 9th Canadian Screen Awards in 2021.

Her other film roles have included Spinster and Dawn, Her Dad and the Tractor.

Filmography

Film

Television

References

External links

21st-century Canadian actresses
Canadian film actresses
Canadian television actresses
Actresses from Winnipeg
Living people
Year of birth missing (living people)